In 2016, the BBC published a report which stated that the administration of United States President Jimmy Carter (1977–1981) had extensive contact with Ayatollah Ruhollah Khomeini and his entourage in the prelude to the Iranian Revolution of 1979. The report was based on "newly declassified US diplomatic cables". According to the report, as mentioned by The Guardian, Khomeini "went to great lengths to ensure the Americans would not jeopardise his plans to return to Iran - and even personally wrote to US officials" and assured them not to worry about their interests in Iran, particularly oil. According to the report, in turn, Carter and his administration helped Khomeini and made sure that the Imperial Iranian army would not launch a military coup.

In his memoir, Answer to History, the Shah claimed that the little-known Khomeini was able to ignite the 1963 demonstrations in Iran with help from foreign agents and that US President Kennedy initially wanted him out of power before later changing his opinion of him. The Shah also claimed that President Jimmy Carter was another liberal president who reminded him of Kennedy and who wanted to interfere in Iran's affairs. In a year prior to the Revolution, Big Oil contracts with Iran were expiring; however, the companies never sought to renew the contracts with the Shah, which according to him was a blackmail threat. Ultimately the Shah claimed that the Americans and British colluded against him due to his 1973 nationalization and oil price hike.  
The BBC report also showed a 1980 CIA analysis, which portrays Khomeini's attempts to contact the US as far back as 1963, during John F. Kennedy's administration. 

Iran's political elite has dismissed these declassified reports. Ayatollah Khamenei stated that "it was based on fabricated documents". Ebrahim Yazdi (formerly a close associate of Khomeini) and Saeed Hajjarian viewed the BBC report with skepticism. Former American security adviser Gary Sick confirmed the veracity of the documents.

November 1978 – January 1979

A declassified cable shows that on 9 November 1978, William H. Sullivan, then-US ambassador to Iran alerted the Carter administration of the Shah being "doomed". Sullivan stated that the US should get Iran's Shah and his most senior generals to exit the country, and construct an agreement between secondary commanders and Ruhollah Khomeini. In January 1979, General Robert E. Huyser was dispatched to Iran. According to the narrative of Carter's government, Huyser was sent to promise US support for the Shah. However, the declassified reports show that Huyser was in fact sent to Iran in order to prevent the Iranian military leaders from orchestrating a coup in order to save the Shah. He was also reportedly tasked with convincing the Iranian military leaders to meet Mohammad Beheshti, Khomeini's second in command. Huyser was soon faced with accusations of neutralizing the Iranian military and for paving the way for Khomeini's ascension to power. However, Huyser himself always strongly denied these claims. Huyser's reports to Washington have not yet been published. In the meantime, US ambassador William Sullivan actively worked behind the scenes in order to undermine the Shah's Prime Minister, Shapour Bakhtiar:

On 9 January 1979, David L. Aaron told to Zbigniew Brzezinski to target Bakhtiar with a military coup and then form a deal between Iran's military leaders and Khomeini's entourage which would remove the Shah from power. On 14 January 1979, with the Shah's government still in power, Cyrus Vance sent a message to the American embassies in France and Iran:

On 15 January 1979, Warren Zimmermann, an official of Carter's government in France, met with Ebrahim Yazdi in Paris. Zimmermann met with Yazdi on two more occasions in Paris, the last meeting being on 18 January 1979. Meanwhile, on 16 January 1979, Mohammad Reza Pahlavi had left Iran; suffering from terminal cancer, he had been told by Carter a few days earlier, on 11 January 1979, to "leave promptly". 

On 27 January 1979, Khomeini told the US just weeks before the overthrow of Mohammad Reza Pahlavi's government:

In mid-to-late January 1979, according to the declassified documents, Carter's government de facto admitted that it would have no issues with the abolishment of the Iranian monarchy and its military, whom were having daily talks with Huyser — as long as the eventual result would come gradually and in a controlled way. Khomeini and his entourage now realized that Carter had discarded Mohammad Reza Pahlavi.

February 1979
Two days before Khomeini's return from France, commander-in-chief Abbas Gharabaghi told Khomeini's entourage that the Iranian military was not against political alterations, particularly with regard to "the cabinet".  On 1 February 1979, Khomeini arrived in Tehran. By 5 February 1979, the Iranian military was not resistant to changes in the type of government anymore, as long as these changes were conducted "legally and gradually". By this point, junior officers and conscripts deserted and a mutiny erupted in the Air Force. On 11 February 1979, Iran's military leaders, behind Shapour Bakhtiar's back, declared neutrality, which de facto meant that they had surrendered.  

Gary Sick, former member of the National Security Council during the period of the Islamic revolution has stated to The Guardian that "the documents [shown by the BBC] are genuine". However he added that he was unaware of Khomeini's alleged attempts to get into contact with the US back in 1963.

1980 meeting in Paris
Declassified documents from Jimmy Carter and an account of Hamilton Jordan, Carter's chief of staff, show that Jordan met with Sadegh Ghotbzadeh in Paris in 1980 to discuss the possibility of extraditing the Shah exchange for the release of embassy hostages. This occurred during the Shah's exile  in Panama when Aristides Royo wouldn't grant the Islamic Republic's extradition's request.

See also
 Conspiracy theories about the overthrow of Mohammad Reza Pahlavi
 Island of Stability (speech)
 October Surprise conspiracy theory

References

1978 in Iran
1979 in Iran
1978 in the United States
1979 in the United States
1978 in international relations
1979 in international relations
2016 in international relations
Presidency of Jimmy Carter
Iranian Revolution
Ruhollah Khomeini
Iran–United States relations